Tobias "Toby" Zachary Ziegler is a fictional character in the television serial drama "The West Wing", played by Richard Schiff. The role of Toby Ziegler earned actor Richard Schiff the Primetime Emmy Award for Outstanding Supporting Actor in a Drama Series in 2000. For most of the series' duration, he is White House Communications Director. In the final season, Ziegler is involved in a storyline around a leak of classified information, which The New York Times compared to the leak investigation of the Valerie Plame affair.

Creation and development
According to series creator Aaron Sorkin, Schiff was cast in the role of Toby Ziegler over many other actors who auditioned, including Eugene Levy. Schiff created a backstory for the character as a widower and wore his own wedding ring, something Sorkin and fellow executive producer Thomas Schlamme, who were planning for the character to be divorced, did not notice until the show's eighth episode. "I had always imagined that his first wife had died, which accounts for his sadness, and why someone would devote himself to public service and be so singular about it", Schiff said. "But then, Aaron and Tommy threw that right out the window."

Schiff had publicly praised the show's writers, and creator Aaron Sorkin in particular, for the richness of the characters in the series. However, during the show's final season, Schiff said he felt let down by the writers as some of his episodes were cut "purely on a financial decision." He was particularly critical of the military shuttle leak storyline, which saw his character indicted for leaking classified information. "Toby would never in 10 million years have betrayed the president in that fashion," Schiff said. "Even if he had, there would have been seven episodes' worth of fights before he did it." He justified the story to himself by reasoning that Toby was covering for somebody else.

Character biography
Tobias Zachary Ziegler was born on December 23, 1954. He is from a working-class background and grew up in Brighton Beach, in the New York City borough of Brooklyn, from a Yiddish-speaking  Ashkenazi Jewish family. His father, Jules "Julie" Ziegler was an immigrant who, according to one episode, "needed the GI Bill," implying that he fought in either the Second World War or the Korean War. He made women's raincoats for a living; however, before this, he was a member of Murder, Inc., the Jewish mafia's enforcement arm and served time in prison, complicating his relationship with Toby.

Toby's mother has been dead for 12 years as of season 3. Both he and his father mention sisters, who Toby says took him to protest rallies in the mid-1960s, as well as nieces and nephews. His younger brother, David, is a mission specialist at NASA who commits suicide after learning that he has terminal cancer. Toby also makes reference to a grandfather who lived to be 96 years old, but for the last 20 years of his life "thought the Habsburgs still lived in a big palace in Vienna."

In Season 4, Episode 19 Toby says that his draft number for Vietnam was not called. Toby was married to Andrea Wyatt, who serves as a congresswoman from Maryland. They divorced during the first year of the Bartlet administration after unsuccessful attempts to have children. Toward the end of the Bartlet re-election campaign, however, Andy becomes pregnant with twins. Following this, Toby begins to actively pursue a renewed relationship with Andy. After his initial proposals of marriage are rejected, and imagining that she is making him chase her, he sets about attempting to eradicate the behaviors that Andy has found irritating in the past. He forces himself to eat salads, and sells his bachelor pad, buying Andy the property she has always considered her "dream house." Andy is mortified by the gesture, refusing his proposal once more and telling him that he is "too sad" for her. Moments later, her water breaks, and the twins—a boy and a girl—are born shortly thereafter. Huck is named for Andy's grandfather, and Molly for Molly O'Connor, a U.S. Secret Service agent who is killed in the line of duty on the day of their birth.

Toby is rather morose, yet he is something of an idealist, often less willing than his colleagues and the president to compromise his political values. He is shown to be a more than formidable opponent in an argument, easily able to hold his own against even Bartlet himself. He is also known for his acerbic wit.

A Reform Jew, Toby sometimes attends synagogue on Shabbat.

He attended City College of New York - he recalls during Season 5 that he had met the Chief Justice of the United States while a student there. It is implied in the episode "And It's Surely to Their Credit" that Toby is an attorney.

Toby is a fan of the New York Yankees. He claims to have attended 441 games at Yankee Stadium. He also reveals his fandom of the New York Knicks and is once seen wearing a New York Giants hat in his office.

At the White House
Before joining the Bartlet presidential campaign, Toby was a professional political operative who worked for various campaigns including New York City Council seats, Bronx Borough President and U.S. House and Senate races. However, he had never been on a winning campaign before Bartlet's 1998 presidential bid. He says that he backs the candidates who should win, rather than those who will win, and is unapologetic about his low winning record.

Once in the White House, Toby is rewarded for his work on the campaign, with Bartlet naming him Communications Director and senior domestic policy advisor. Later, it is revealed that Toby was not the president's first choice for the job, although Bartlet confides that he is grateful his first choice turned down the job. Of all the senior staffers, Toby is the most prone to clash with the President, being unafraid to challenge his judgment and question his actions when he feels Bartlet is not acting according to his true morality.

When Will Bailey leaves the president's staff to work for the vice president, Toby interprets the move as a betrayal and develops an antagonistic attitude towards Will that never is truly fixed (they simply go from being constantly at odds to having little or nothing to do with each other, though Will is shocked and left near tears when a devastated C.J. tells him about the shuttle leak and installs him as the new Director of Communications). Similarly, when Josh leaves the White House to run a presidential campaign for Matt Santos, Toby views this as a betrayal and is extremely hostile to Josh until long after. His reaction is eventually explained with the revelation that his brother David, recently diagnosed with terminal cancer, committed suicide rather than live what time he had left: "He could have had years. But instead, he just dropped everything and walked away." Toby feels "walking away" is what Josh has also done. Josh later (successfully) moves to keep their friendship alive, and Toby keeps advising Josh as he tries to get Santos elected president.

Toby's oldest friend in the White House is C.J. Cregg, whom he met during an earlier campaign and whom he personally recruited for the position of Press Secretary. When Toby is fired in Bartlet's final year for leaking state secrets, their close relationship is hit hard and neither reconcile until the penultimate episode of the series and Toby's final scene.

Toby accomplishes much in his tenure as Communications Director, including writing both of Bartlet's inaugural addresses as well as his State of the Union addresses. His most notable accomplishment is "fixing" Social Security during the fifth season of the show, the sixth year of the Bartlet administration. He thinks of it early one morning, almost resigns after it is leaked by the senator who he is persuading to break with partisan politics, but then fixes it with the help of Josh Lyman. After C.J. Cregg's promotion from Press Secretary to White House Chief of Staff in early season six, he also serves as the de facto White House Press Secretary in addition to his role as Communications Director. Toby initially has trouble facing the press in the new role and makes several gaffes, but learns to perform well with the help of new Deputy Press Secretary Annabeth Schott.

Military shuttle leak storyline
In the episode "Things Fall Apart," the International Space Station develops a critical oxygen leak. With no civilian shuttles available to perform a rescue mission in time, a three-person crew finds itself trapped aboard the ISS. While the president contemplates rescue options, C.J. becomes aware of the possibility that a secret military space shuttle could be prepared in time to rescue the crew. However, this would involve revealing the shuttle's existence, particularly as one of the ISS crew is a Russian military officer. C.J. shares her speculation with several senior White House staff, including Toby. The information is leaked to Greg Brock, a reporter for The New York Times, which triggers a full-scale investigation.

In the episode "Mr. Frost", Toby admits to C.J. that he leaked the classified information, which estranges the two. He knew that if the military shuttle's existence became public knowledge, the public would demand the safe return of the astronauts, which is what ultimately occurred. White House Counsel Oliver Babish debriefs Toby until his lawyer ends the interview. Toby reveals that he discussed the possible existence of the shuttle with C.J., but does not state that C.J. initiated the conversation. Toby offers his resignation to Bartlet, but Bartlet does not accept the resignation because he must dismiss Toby "for cause". Babish waits with Toby before he is escorted out of the White House, saying that someone should at least thank Toby for his years of service and wait with him to soften the blow.

Toby attends Leo McGarry's funeral, but sits in the back of the church to avoid press coverage. He is similarly unable to attend Leo's burial at Arlington National Cemetery because of the press circus his attendance would cause. Later C.J. is at an impasse about what to do after the administration's time ends and visits Toby. The two have a heartfelt reconciliation, with Toby advising her to take a leap of faith when C.J. finds herself at a personal and professional crossroad. Despite strong mixed emotions, Bartlet's final official act as president is to pardon Toby and thus spare him from having to serve his prison sentence. In the episode "The Ticket", a flash forward reveals that, at the time of the dedication of Bartlet's presidential library three years later, Toby has been teaching at Columbia University. Toby has been invited to the dedication by Bartlet and it appears they have moved on from the shuttle leak incident with Toby quietly offering to help Bartlet write his speech for the dedication. Schiff had rationalised that the leak had in fact come from Toby's recently deceased astronaut brother, David, an idea hinted at in-show in a later scene between Toby and his ex-wife Andy; it is left hanging whether Bartlett and Ziegler's reconciliation in the 'flash forward' may have been enabled by his becoming aware of Toby having actually protected the reputation of his brother, or simply the passage of time since the incident allowed tempers to cool.

See also 
List of characters on The West Wing
List of The West Wing episodes

References

The West Wing characters
Fictional political consultants
Fictional Democrats (United States)
Fictional characters from New York City
Fictional American Jews
Fictional Columbia University people
Fictional United States Marine Corps personnel
Television characters introduced in 1999
Fictional White House Press Secretaries